The Audience is a play by the British playwright and screenwriter Peter Morgan. The play centres on weekly meetings, called audiences, between Queen Elizabeth II, originally played by Helen Mirren, and her prime ministers. It premiered in the West End in 2013, at the Gielgud Theatre. A Broadway production opened in 2015, also starring Mirren. A West End revival played in London in 2015 starring Kristin Scott Thomas in the lead role.

Overview
The Audience is centred on the weekly audiences given by Queen Elizabeth II to Prime Ministers from her accession in 1952 to the present day. Three Prime Ministers are omitted from the play: Harold Macmillan, Sir Alec Douglas-Home and Edward Heath are not featured. Tony Blair originally did not feature in the play, but was added when the play transferred to Broadway, replacing James Callaghan, who was excluded from subsequent productions. Advice regarding the political and historical content of the weekly audiences was provided by Professor Vernon Bogdanor (Emeritus Professor of Government at Oxford University), the former tutor of David Cameron, Prime Minister from 2010 until 2016.

Production history
The Audience is written by British playwright and screenwriter Peter Morgan. Its premiere production opened in the West End at the Gielgud Theatre on 15 February 2013, with its press night on 5 March. The play featured Helen Mirren as Queen Elizabeth II; the actress had played the same role in the 2006 film The Queen, which was also written by Morgan. The play was directed by Stephen Daldry, with costume design by Bob Crowley, lighting design by Rick Fisher, sound by Paul Arditti, music by Paul Englishby and video design by Ian William Galloway. A typical West End performance ran two hours and 30 minutes, including one interval.

Following the death of former prime minister Margaret Thatcher, who is featured during the play's run, Morgan made a speech to the audience to mark her passing. Subsequently, a reference to the late prime minister's death and the Queen's attendance at her funeral was added as a part of the Queen's dialogue with David Cameron. The production was broadcast live to cinemas as part of National Theatre Live on 13 June 2013. The initial broadcast broke the record for most people watching a production live since the scheme began, with nearly 80,000 people watching in the UK and 30,000 people in North America. Further encore screenings were later broadcast.

The play began a limited Broadway engagement from 8 March to 28 June 2015, at the Gerald Schoenfeld Theatre, with previews from 14 February 2015. Helen Mirren reprised her role of Queen Elizabeth II in this production, alongside fellow original cast members Geoffrey Beevers, Michael Elwyn, Richard McCabe and Rufus Wright.

A West End revival began at the Apollo Theatre, opening on 5 May 2015, following previews from 21 April 2015, with Dame Kristin Scott Thomas as Queen Elizabeth II. For the 2015 production, the role of James Callaghan was removed to allow them to feature former prime minister Tony Blair, and the script was updated pending a general election. Following the election on 7 May 2015, the scene featuring David Cameron meeting the Queen was updated to show Cameron had won a second term and showed the Queen asking him to form a government.
The audience between Cameron and the Queen was changed several times over the 15-week run in the West End to keep up to date with current political events. After the general election results, references were made to Nicola Sturgeon and the success of the Scottish National Party winning seats from the Labour Party. Other current events references made during the audience scene between the Queen and Cameron included the corruption scandal at FIFA and the Greek bailout debate known as "Grexit". During the last week of the run, a reference was made to newspaper articles displaying the Queen apparently making a Nazi salute in her youth and to the birthday of Prince George.

In May 2017, the play received its Russian premiere in Moscow and starred Inna Churikova as the Queen, along with Mikhail Gorevoy as Winston Churchill and Galina Tunina as Margaret Thatcher.

Fiona Reid assumed the role of the Queen in the 2017 Mirvish Productions mounting of the play at Toronto's Royal Alexandra Theatre. The Toronto cast included Paul Essiembre as Eden, Kate Hennig as Thatcher, Benedict Campbell as Brown, Kevin Klassen as Blair and Ben Carlson as Cameron.

In popular culture
The 'Traviata' model handbag by British designer Launer London received a surge in popularity and was subsequently re-issued by the brand following the use of one as a prop in The Audience both in the West End and on Broadway. It is the style often used by Queen Elizabeth II.

Specific episodes of the Netflix series The Crown, created by Peter Morgan, acknowledge inspiration from The Audience, produced by Playful productions LLP, Robert Fox LTD and Andy Harries. The play is cited in the credits of the first, fifth and eighth episodes of season 1, the third and eighth episodes of season 2, the second and ninth episode of season 3, and the second, fifth and tenth episode of season 4.

Principal roles and original cast 

 Notes
 Robert Hardy withdrew from the role of Churchill before press night in the original West End production for health reasons.

Awards and honours

Original West End Production

Original Broadway Production

References

External links

 
 
 

English plays
2013 plays
Cultural depictions of Elizabeth II
Cultural depictions of Winston Churchill
Cultural depictions of Margaret Thatcher
Cultural depictions of John Major
Cultural depictions of Tony Blair
Cultural depictions of Gordon Brown
Cultural depictions of Harold Wilson
Cultural depictions of British prime ministers
Plays about British royalty
West End plays
Broadway plays
Plays set in London
Plays set in the 1950s
Plays set in the 1960s
Plays set in the 1970s
Plays set in the 1980s
Plays set in the 1990s
Plays set in the 21st century
Tony Award-winning plays